World Mind Games may refer to:

World Mind Sports Games, quadrennial multi-sport event created by the International Mind Sports Association 
SportAccord World Mind Games, annual multi-sport event initiated by SportAccord